"Crazy in Love" is a 2003 song by Beyoncé featuring Jay-Z.

Crazy in Love may also refer to:

Film and television
Crazy in Love (film), a 1992 American comedy film
Crazy in Love, Europe release title of Mozart and the Whale, a 2005 American film starring Josh Hartnett
"Crazy in Love" (Will & Grace), a 2001 episode of Will & Grace
Kerry Katona: Crazy in Love, British reality television series starring Kerry Katona

Music
Crazy in Love (album), a 1990 album by Conway Twitty
Crazy in Love!, a 1957 album by Trudy Richards
Crazy in Love (Itzy album), a 2021 album by Itzy
"Crazy in Love" (Kim Carnes song), also recorded by Conway Twitty
"Crazy in Love" (Jill Johnson song),  2003
"Crazy in Love", a 1963 single by The Ike-Ettes
"Crazy in Love", a song by Eminem on the 2004 album Encore
"Crazy in Love", a song by Nicol Sponberg
"Crazy in Love", a 2021 song by Shayne Ward

See also
Crazy Love (disambiguation)